The Oak Grove School District is a school district in San Jose, California, serving the South San Jose region. It operates 15 elementary schools (K-6) and three intermediate schools (7-8 unless otherwise noted). The district has more than 600 teachers (FTEs) serving more than 9,800 students.

District employee information 

This list shows the current members working for the district.

Board of Trustees

Schools

Note: So far, based on 2021-2022 school year data from the OGSD official website and further information from the California Department of Education.

Former schools

Note: So far, based on the data of the latest school year from the Public School Review and further information from the California Department of Education.

References

External links 

School districts in San Jose, California